Jason Daniltchenko (born 2 September 1975) is an Australian rules footballer who played for North Melbourne in the Australian Football League (AFL).

Playing career
Daniltchenko made his senior AFL debut for North Melbourne in 1993. Between 1993 and 1997 he played 29 matches, scoring 18 goals.

He was selected by Hawthorn in the 1998 AFL preseason draft but did not play a game for the Hawks. He suffered an ACL during a pre-season practice match and missed the entire season. In 1999 he played the entire season with the reserves but got delisted at the end of the season.

References

External links
 
 

1975 births
Living people
North Melbourne Football Club players
Australian rules footballers from Victoria (Australia)